Thomas Fitz Sealy (February 23, 1921 – November 29, 2000) was a former professional basketball player.  He was a member of the Harlem Globetrotters.  He also played for the Dayton Rens of the National Basketball League.

Sealy was featured in the film Tommy and the Basketball. He was an active player in 1946 for the Harlem Globetrotters.  Sealy was 6'2" and played for Brooklyn College.  He played all 40 games for the Rens in the 1948-49 season, finishing the season as their 5th leading scorer with 260 points (6.5 points per game). He died in November 2000.

References

1921 births
2000 deaths
American men's basketball players
United States Army personnel of World War II
Basketball players from Philadelphia
Brooklyn Bulldogs men's basketball players
Dayton Rens players
Detroit Vagabond Kings players
Harlem Globetrotters players
New York Renaissance players
Guards (basketball)
Brooklyn College alumni
20th-century African-American sportspeople